This is a list of cities in the world by gross domestic product (GDP). The United Nations uses three definitions for what constitutes a city, as not all cities may be classified using the same criteria. Cities may be defined as the cities proper, the extent of their urban area, or their metropolitan regions. The methodology of calculating GDP may differ between the studies and are widely based on projections and sometimes approximate estimations, notably for cities that are not within the Organisation for Economic Co-operation and Development. Refer to sources for more information. Click on the headers to reorganize columns.

Major metropolitan areas (PPP)
Major metropolitan areas contributing at least 2.5% of world GDP.

Full List (Nominal)
Each of the columns in the table is sortable by pressing on the arrows at the head of the column:

Notes

Cities (metropolitan areas) by percentage of national GDP

See also
 List of cheapest cities
 List of EU metropolitan areas by GDP
 List of U.S. metropolitan areas by GDP
 List of most expensive cities for expatriate employees
 List of country subdivisions by GDP over 200 billion US dollars

References

GDP
GDP